Agarani, also known as Kojori Fortress or Azeuli Fortress or Kor Ogli Fortress is a Georgian feudal fortress located near Tbilisi, in Kvemo Kartli region. In historical sources it is often referred to as "Agarata Fortress", which defended the main road to Tbilisi from the south, on the way of important caravan route.

Geography 
The fortress was built at the top of Azeuli Mountain (1350 m a.s.l.) on Didi Kedi Range of volcanic origin, a part of Trialeti mountains.

History 

The fortress was mentioned in The Georgian Chronicles, but the time of its construction is unknown. In the 1060s King Bagrat IV took it over from emir Fadlon. During the "Great Turkish Invasion" (1080) the fortress was captured by the enemy, and that is when it received the name "Kor Ogli". This name was still used on Soviet topographic maps. In July 1118, David the Builder besieged Agarani in one day, and in 1123 gave it to Ivane Orbeli. The Orbelis later rebelled against the King Georgy III, and lost their possession. "Agarani Fortress" was a summer residence of Georgian kings. According to the chronicles, Queen Tamar was brought ill to Agarani and here she died, but her burial place is unknown. From 15th century the fortress belonged to Sologashvili family, when it was called "Kojori Fortress". According to Vakhushti Batonishvili, it was previously known as the "Azulula Fortress". In February 1921, the Georgian cadets of Officer School died in a battle against the Red Army, which happened by the fortress.

Bibliography 

D. Berdzenishvili, Georgian Soviet Encyclopedia, I, p. 52, Tbilisi, 1975.

Castles and forts in Georgia (country)
Buildings and structures in Kvemo Kartli